Clepsis chlorodoxa is a species of moth of the family Tortricidae. It is found in India (Punjab).

See also
 List of moths of India

References

Moths described in 1920
Clepsis